Neutral amino acid transporter A is a protein that in humans is encoded by the SLC1A4 gene.

Function 
The transporter is responsible for transport of L-serine, L-alanine, L-cysteine, and L-threonine.

Pathology 

Mutations of the gene cause a disease called spastic tetraplegia, thin corpus callosum, and progressive microcephaly (SPATCCM). This disorder is inherited in an autosomal recessive fashion.

Interactions 
In melanocytic cells SLC1A4 gene expression may be regulated by MITF.

See also
 Glutamate transporter
 Solute carrier family

References

Further reading

Solute carrier family